A tug (or) or sulde,  is a pole with circularly arranged horse or yak tail hairs of varying colors arranged at the top. It was historically flown by Turkic tribes such as Tuğluğ Confederation and also during the period of the Mongol Empire, and later used in derived Turco-Mongol khanates. It was also used by the Ottoman Empire, a state which was founded by Turkic Oghuz tribes. 
In the 17th century, it was also adopted by Slavic cavalry  (cossacks, haidamaka), under the name bunchuk which is the reflection of the original Turkic word boncuk. It is still used by some units of the Polish military.

History

Early history 
According to Gerard Clauson, the Turkic word tu:ğ, for traditional Turkic standards made from horse-tails or bunches of horse-hair, was borrowed from Middle Chinese *dok 纛 "banner, standard" (whence also standard Chinese dú).  However, according to linguist Sevan Nişanyan, the author of the first etymological dictionary of Turkish, it is more likely in terms of cultural history that the Chinese word tu or dú is borrowed from Turkic or Mongolic. Hence, Chinese observers, who possibly first saw the nomadic concept of tug from their Turkic or Mongolic neighbors to the north, stated that the medieval Kök-Turks displayed a tuğ decorated with a wolf's head at their camp's gate in order not to forget their origin from a she-wolf ancestress. A Western Turkic tribal confederation, the Duolu, was possibly named after tuğ, if Old Turkic Tuğluğ (𐱃𐰆𐰍𐰞𐰍), which means "have flags (banners), have standards".

It was also used by Mongolic tribes too. The white-haired banner is used as a peacetime symbol, while the black banner was for wartime. Usage of the horse tail is symbolic because horses were central to the Mongols' livelihood. This is similar to the use of horse tail hairs for the morin khuur. The original white banner disappeared early in history, but the black one survived as the repository of Genghis Khan's soul. The Mongols continued to honor the banner, and Zanabazar (1635–1723) built a monastery with the special mission of flying and protecting the black banner in the 17th century. Around 1937, the black banner disappeared amidst the great purges of the nationalists, monks and intellectuals, and the destruction of monasteries.

Modern era

The Nine White banners 
The Nine White banners came into renewed significance in Mongolia after democracy was adopted in the early 1990s as a symbol of the traditional Mongolian state, replacing the previous communist red flags.

The Nine White Banners was a peacetime emblem used exclusively by the Khans in front of their yurt. The central banner is larger in size than the rest and is placed in the center of the other eight. The modern Mongolian nine white banners are kept in the Government Palace in Ulaanbaatar. On National Pride Day, a traditional ceremony for the Nine White Banners is held.

Black banners 
It is made of black horse tail hairs and flown in the same fashion. According to the illustrated Japanese chronicle Mōko Shūrai Ekotoba, the banner of the Mongolian Yuan fleet that invaded Japan was black. The modern Mongolian black banners are kept in the Ministry of Defense.

Tugs in the Mongolian military 
Within the Mongolian Armed Forces, the black tug is used as the finial in military colours' flagpoles, while the white tug is used by the Mongolian State Honor Guard and is the finial in the colours of the civil security services.

See also 
Flag of Mongolia
Historical colours, standards and guidons
Banners of Inner Mongolia

References

Boeheim, Wendelin (1890). Handbuch der Waffenkunde: Das Waffenwesen in seiner historischen Entwickelung vom Beginn des Mittelalters bis zum Ende des 18. Jahrhunderts. E. A. Seemann, Leipzig. 
 William Erskine. A history of India under the two first sovereigns of the house of Taimur, Báber and Humáyun. Longman, Brown, Green, and Longmans, 1854.  Pg 265. 
Zdzislaw Zygulski, Ottoman Art in the Service of Empire, Hagop Kevorkian Series on Near Eastern Art & Civilization,  New York University Press (1992).

External links

  
  
  
 Jack Weatherford, "Wind", First Year Course on Genghis Khan  (macalester.edu 2004)
Photo reportage, a tribute ceremony to the Great Black Banners, Ulaanbaatar, Mongolia

National symbols of Mongolia
Mongolian culture
Mongol Empire
Crimean Khanate
Military of Mongolia